Professor Jan Remmelink (27 April 1922, Zelhem, Gelderland – 15 May 2003, Groningen) was Attorney General of the High Council of the Netherlands from 1968 to 1989. In 1979 he became member of the Royal Netherlands Academy of Arts and Sciences. He headed the Dutch government committee on euthanasia that released the first, official study of the practice of euthanasia in the Netherlands in 1991. Internationally, this report - Medical Decisions About the End of Life, also called the Remmelink Report - has led to much discussion.

References

Medical Decisions About the End of Life, I. Report of the Committee to Study the Medical Practice Concerning Euthanasia. II. The Study for the Committee on Medical Practice Concerning Euthanasia (2 vols.), The Hague, September 19, 1991.

External links

Digest of the Remmelink report

1922 births
2003 deaths
People from Bronckhorst
20th-century Dutch lawyers
Euthanasia in the Netherlands
Members of the Royal Netherlands Academy of Arts and Sciences